1542 Schalén, provisional designation , is a background asteroid from the outer region of the asteroid belt, approximately 45 kilometers in diameter. It was discovered on 26 August 1941, by Finnish astronomer Yrjö Väisälä at Turku Observatory in Southwest Finland. The dark D-type asteroid was later named after Swedish astronomer Karl Schalén.

Orbit and classification 

Schalén is a background asteroid, located near the region of the Themis family, a dynamical family of outer-belt asteroids with nearly coplanar ecliptical orbits. It orbits the Sun at a distance of 2.7–3.5 AU once every 5 years and 5 months (1,987 days). Its orbit has an eccentricity of 0.12 and an inclination of 3° with respect to the ecliptic.

Physical characteristics 

Schalén has a dark D-type spectrum, mostly found among Hildian asteroids and Jupiter trojans. Bodies with a D-type spectra are thought to have originated in the Kuiper belt.

Diameter and albedo 

According to the 2014-result of the survey carried by NASA's Wide-field Infrared Survey Explorer with its subsequent NEOWISE mission, Schalén measures 42.374 kilometers in diameter and its surface has an albedo of 0.068, while the Collaborative Asteroid Lightcurve Link derives an albedo of 0.0509 and a diameter of 45.05 kilometers with an absolute magnitude of 10.6.

Rotation period 

In November 2012, a rotational lightcurve of Schalén was obtained from photometric observations by astronomers at the Purple Mountain Observatory in collaboration with observatories in the United States. Lightcurve analysis gave a well-defined rotation period of 7.516 hours with a brightness variation of 0.49 magnitude.

Naming 

This minor planet was named in honour of Swedish astronomer Karl Adam Wilhelm Schalén (1902–1993), who was a director of the Swedish Lund Observatory. The official  was published by the Minor Planet Center on 20 February 1976.

References

External links 
 Asteroid Lightcurve Database (LCDB), query form (info )
 Dictionary of Minor Planet Names, Google books
 Asteroids and comets rotation curves, CdR – Observatoire de Genève, Raoul Behrend
 Discovery Circumstances: Numbered Minor Planets (1)-(5000) – Minor Planet Center
 
 

001542
Discoveries by Yrjö Väisälä
Named minor planets
001542
19410826